Lagerstroemia subcostata (also known as the Taiwan crepe myrtle) is a deciduous tree which is native to Japan, Taiwan, China and the Philippines.

References

External links

Taiwan's Ecological Conservation: Lagerstroemia subcostata

subcostata
Trees of China
Trees of Japan
Trees of the Philippines
Trees of Taiwan